Irène Zurkinden (December 11, 1909 – December 27, 1987) was a Swiss painter.

Life and achievements 
Irène Zurkinden spent her childhood in Basel and Münchenstein. Her father was a customs officer from Fribourg, her mother Jeanne was a dance instructor. Irène's family was very open-minded and allowed the adolescent who wanted to become a fashion illustrator to enroll at Basel's art school in 1925. There, Irène Zurkinden attended drawing classes with Albrecht Mayer (1875–1952), studied color theory under Arnold Fiechter (1879–1943) and graphic arts under  Fritz Baumann (1886–1942). Until she got her degree in 1929, she produced mainly portrait drawings.

That year, Irène Zurkinden made her first trip to Paris, where she continued her education for a few months at the  Académie de la Grande Chaumière. In 1932, she spent a couple of months in the French capital with  Meret Oppenheim, a friend since around 1927/28. In the years following her graduating, Ms. Zurkinden began painting more scenic cityscapes in a style clearly influenced by Impressionism. During this time, she lived alternately in Paris and Basel, where she earned herself a reputation as a popular portrait artist. From 1932 to 1972, the artist had an annual exhibition in the Gallery of Marguerite Schulthess in Basel's Aeschenvorstadt. After Marguerite Schulthess's death, Ms. Zurkinden became a fixture of Basel's Gallery Riehentor, whose owner Trudl Bruckner was a founding member of ART Basel. In 1980, the Beyeler Gallery in Basel's Bäumleingasse presented the artist in a solo exhibition.

In 1934, Irène Zurkinden met jazz musician Kurt Fenster, the son of a Brazilian circus artist and a German mother. During the Nazi dictatorship, Fenster emigrated to Paris. The couple lived for several years in the French capital. At the outbreak of  World War 2, Irène Zurkinden returned to Switzerland. Her sons Nicolas (Kolka) (*1937) and Stephan (*1943) from her relationship with Kurt Fenster grew up with their mother in Basel.

From 1942,  Irène Zurkinden participated in the exhibitions of Group 33. During the second half of the 1930s and the early 1940s, she produced works inspired by surrealism. In 1985, the Kunstmuseum Basel honored her with a comprehensive retrospective of her work.

After World War 2, Irène Zurkinden lived in Basel and Paris and made long trips to  Morocco (1948), Spain (1950/51) and Italy (1952/53). In those years, she designed costumes and sets for the Stadttheater Basel and increasingly worked on book illustrations.

Awards and commemoration 

 In 1978 she was honored in her childhood home, receiving the Sperber-Kollegium "Ehrespalebärglemer" award.
 In 1986 she was awarded the Basel Cultural Award.
 The city of Basel honored the artist in 2014 by naming a tree-lined public square "Irène Zurkinden Square". It is a new traffic junction at the planned Dreispitz high-rise.

Works 
 Autoportrait en chapeau de paille, 1929, LM, C. Bernoulli, Basel
 Porträt Paul Sacher, o. J., Privatbesitz
 Meret à l'orange, 1932–1935, Kunstmuseum Basel
 Pariser Dächer, 1934, Öffentliche Kunstsammlung Basel-Stadt
 Dialogue muet sur le bonheur, 1936, Privatsammlung
 Le cirque du monde, o. J., Privatsammlung Riehen
 Interieur mit geschmücktem Weihnachtsbaum, 1939, Merian-Iselin-Spital, Basel
 La gare d'Agen (Lot et Garonne), 1940, Privatbesitz
 Ballet lugubre, 1942, Privatbesitz
 Friedhof in Paris, um 1950, Privatbesitz Barcelona
 Rêve: Cocteau mène la danse, 1962, Privatbesitz
 Paris, Gare Montparnasse, 1966, Sammlung Hotel "Les Trois Rois", Basel
 Filles maboules sur boules, 1975, Privatbesitz
 Park in Paris, 1985, Privatbesitz

Book illustrations 
 Hans Christian Andersen: Die Schneekönigin. Märchen in sieben Geschichten mit fünf Farblithografien von Irène Zurkinden. Bern o. J. (ca. 1950)
 Colette: Die Freundin. Franz. Original La Seconde (erschienen 1931), ins Deutsche übertragen von Waltrud Kappeler und Louis Erlacher, mit Illustrationen von Irène Zurkinden, Zürich 1956
 Helen Vischer: Anmutig heiteres Lob und literarisches Denkmal für die Stadt Basel. Zürich 1956
 Maud Frère: Einsames Herz. Franz. Original La Grenouille, ins Deutsche übertragen von Marguerite Janson mit Illustrationen von Irène Zurkinden, Zürich 1962
 Barbey d'Aurevilly: Le rideau cramoisi. Mit elf Lithografien von Irène Zurkinden, Lausanne 1970
 Hermann Schneider: Der Mann mit dem Hifthorn. Basel o. J. (ca. 1971)
 Johann Wolfgang von Goethe: Aus den Memoiren des Marshalls von Bassompierre. Mit sieben Federzeichnungen von Irène Zurkinden, Basel 1974

Literature 
 Christian Geelhaar: Irène Zurkinden. Kunstmuseum Basel, 1985.
 Simone Gojan: Irène Zurkinden. In: Andreas Kotte (Hrsg.): Theaterlexikon der Schweiz. Band 3, Chronos, Zürich 2005, p. 2165.
 Hans-Joachim Müller: Irène Zurkinden. Friedrich Reinhardt AG, 2006 .

References

This article was initially translated from the German Wikipedia page.

External links 
 Literatur von und über Irène Zurkinden im Katalog der Deutschen Nationalbibliothek
 Biografie und Bibliografie bei sikart.ch Schweizerisches Institut für Kunstwissenschaft
 Tapan Bhattacharya: Irène Zurkinden im Historischen Lexikon der Schweiz
Portrait of Irène Zurkinden photographed by Man Ray.

1909 births
1987 deaths
20th-century Swiss painters
Swiss women painters
20th-century Swiss women artists
People from Basel-Landschaft